Eva Moga (born 25 July 1968) is a Spanish former alpine skier who competed in the 1988 Winter Olympics.

References

1968 births
Living people
Olympic alpine skiers of Spain
Alpine skiers at the 1988 Winter Olympics
Spanish female alpine skiers
Place of birth missing (living people)